Nourredine Yagoubi (born 8 January 1974) is an Algerian judoka.

Yagoubi represented Algeria at the 2000 Summer Olympics in Sydney and the 2004 Summer Olympics in Athens. In Sydney he competed in the Men's 73 kg weight category. Yagoubi's first bout was against Kouami Sacha Denanyoh of Togo, this bout Yagoubi was the victor. In the second round of competition, Yagoubi faced eventual silver medalists Tiago Camilo of Brazil, this bout Yagoubi lost but he was later put through to the repechages. Yagoubi's first repechage bout was against Israel's Gil Offer and Yougabi won, proceeding to the next round. In his second repechage bout, Yagoubi lost to Michel Almeida of Portugal and this was his final bout of the games.

At the 2004 Summer Olympics Yagoubi once more in the Men's 73 kg weight category. Yagoubi won his first bout against Akapei Latu of Samoa 1111-0000. But in the second round he was paired up to Ukraine's Gennadiy Bilodid, this bout Yagoubi lost 0000-1000. This time round Yagoubi didn't proceed through to the repechage rounds.

Achievements

References

1974 births
Living people
Algerian male judoka
Judoka at the 2000 Summer Olympics
Judoka at the 2004 Summer Olympics
Olympic judoka of Algeria
Mediterranean Games bronze medalists for Algeria
Mediterranean Games medalists in judo
Competitors at the 2001 Mediterranean Games
Competitors at the 2005 Mediterranean Games
African Games bronze medalists for Algeria
African Games medalists in judo
Competitors at the 1999 All-Africa Games
21st-century Algerian people
20th-century Algerian people